Paracantha dentata is a species of tephritid or fruit flies in the genus Paracantha of the family Tephritidae.

Distribution
Peru.

References

Tephritinae
Insects described in 1952
Diptera of South America